Chudinov is a Russian masculine surname, its feminine counterpart is Chudinova. It may refer to
Dmitry Chudinov (born 1986), Russian professional boxer
Elena Chudinova (born 1959), Russian writer, poet, publicist, and playwright
Fedor Chudinov (born 1987), Russian professional boxer, brother of Dimitry
Igor Chudinov (born 1961), Prime Minister of Kyrgyzstan 
Maxim Chudinov (born 1990), Russian ice hockey player
Sergey Chudinov (born 1983), Russian skeleton racer

References

Russian-language surnames